Leopoldina Ross Davyes (born 20 June 1976 in Bissau) is an amateur Guinea-Bissauan freestyle wrestler, who competed in the women's flyweight category. Ross captured a gold medal in the same division at the 2000 African Wrestling Championships, and later represented Guinea-Bissau at the 2004 Summer Olympics, where she became the nation's  flag bearer in the opening ceremony. During her sporting career, she has been training for the Wrestling Club of Sportschool in Bissau under her personal coach Alberto Pereira.

Ross qualified for her Guinea-Bissau squad in the women's 48 kg class at the 2004 Summer Olympics in Athens by receiving a continental berth from the African Championships in Cairo, Egypt. She received two straight losses and no classification points in a preliminary pool match against France's Angélique Berthenet and Mongolia's Tsogtbazaryn Enkhjargal, finishing thirteenth overall out of fourteen wrestlers.

References

External links
Profile – International Wrestling Database

1976 births
Living people
Bissau-Guinean female sport wrestlers
Olympic wrestlers of Guinea-Bissau
Wrestlers at the 2004 Summer Olympics
Sportspeople from Bissau